Roller Cambindo (born 29 October 1978) is a Colombian former footballer who last played for Defensor San Alejandro of the Peruvian Segunda División. He played as a centre back.

Titles
 Atlético Junior 2010 (Torneo Apertura Colombian Primera División Championship)

References
 Profile at BDFA 
 

1978 births
Living people
Colombian footballers
Colombian expatriate footballers
Ferro Carril Oeste footballers
Millonarios F.C. players
Once Caldas footballers
Deportes Tolima footballers
Atlético Junior footballers
León de Huánuco footballers
Club Deportivo Universidad de San Martín de Porres players
Categoría Primera A players
Peruvian Primera División players
Peruvian Segunda División players
Expatriate footballers in Argentina
Expatriate footballers in Peru
Association football defenders
People from Buenaventura, Valle del Cauca
Sportspeople from Valle del Cauca Department